In sailboat racing, a layline is an imaginary line extending from the objective (typically a racing mark) to indicate the point at which a boat should tack or jibe in order to just clear the mark on the correct side (weather side if upwind tacking, leeward side if downwind jibing).

External links
 How to hit the right layline, Yachts and Yachting Magazine
 Lay lines and building startups, Mark Morion.

Sailing (sport)
Sports terminology